AC2 may refer to:

In video gaming
 Ace Combat 2
 Armored Core 2
 Asheron's Call 2
 Assassin's Creed II

Other uses
 AC-2, a submarine telecommunications cable system
 AC-2 Buffalo, a transport aircraft
 AC2: Combat Shield and Mini-adventure, an accessory for Dungeons & Dragons
 Southern Pacific class AC-2, a class of steam locomotives
 TRAXX F140 AC2, a locomotive
 AC2 Treated lumber